Kannur Railway Station, also formerly known as Cannanore,  is the largest railway station serving the City of Kannur in Kerala. It lies in the Shoranur–Mangalore section of the Southern Railways of the Indian Railways. It is the largest railway station in terms of area and number of tracks in North Malabar region. At  in financial year 2018–19, it is the fifth largest in terms of passenger revenues in Kerala, and second largest under Palakkad division. Almost all major trains connecting the other parts of Kerala, Tamil Nadu, Andhra Pradesh and North India halt here. Kannur and Kannur South (Station Code: CS) are two different stations which serve Kannur city.

Infrastructure
Kannur Railway Station has four platforms, namely Platform No.1, 1A, 2 and 3 and two entrances. Another platform has been proposed to be constructed on the Eastern Entrance side. The Platform number 1 of the Kannur Railway Station is the second longest railway platform in the state of Kerala. The railway station has lift and escalator facilities, as well as an subway facility to cross platform. The station is also equipped with free wireless internet access facility, and prepaid auto stand.

Location
Kannur Railway station is located just 1 km from both Central Bus Terminal, Kannur at Thavakkara which is Kerala's biggest bus terminal and Old Bus Stand, Kannur respectively, and 2 km from KSRTC bus depot at Caltex Junction (on NH-66) and 1.5 km from City Bus Stand near  the District HQ Hospital. 
Kannur International Airport is just 27 km from the railway station.

Important trains
 Janshatabdi express
 Rajdhani express
 Kerala Sampark Kranti sf express
 Mangala Lakshadweep sf express
 Garibrath express
 Netravati express
 Parasuram Express
 Ernakulam Intercity express
 Coimbatore Intercity sf express
 Ernad express
 Malabar express
 Maveli express
 Navyug express
 Vivek express
 Marusagar express
 Poorna express
 Chennai sf Mail
 West Coast sf express
 Chennai sf express
 Link express
 Alleppey Executive Express
 Manglore–Trivandrum express
 Yeswantpur express via Salem
 Bengaluru City express via Manglore
 Manglore–Kacheguda express
 Okha–Ernakulam express
 Gandhidam–Nagercoil express
 Veraval–Trivandrum express
 Bikaner–Kochuveli express
 Bhavnagar–Kochuveli express
 Dehradun–Kochuveli sf express
 Amritsar–Kochuveli sf express
 LTT–Kochuveli sf express
 Nizamuddin–Trivandrum sf express

Trains starting from Kannur 

 Kannur–Kozhikode Express
 Kannur–Mangaluru Central MEMU Exp
 Kannur–Shoranur Express
 Kannur–Cheruvathoor Express
 Kannur–Coimbatore Express
 Kannur–Thiruvananthapuram Central Jan Shatabdi Express
 Kannur–Ernakulam Intercity Express
 Kannur–Alappuzha Executive Express
 Kannur–KSR Bengaluru Express (Via Mangaluru Junction)
 Kannur–Yeshwantpur Express (Via Shornur Junction)

Gallery

See also
North Malabar
Southern Railway zone
Indian Railways
Thalassery
Kannur

References

External links

Railway stations in Kannur district
Transport in Kannur
Buildings and structures in Kannur
Palakkad railway division
Railway stations opened in 1907
1907 establishments in India